The 1932 Hamburg state election was held on 24 April 1932 to elect the 160 members of the Hamburg Parliament.

Results

References 

1932 elections in Germany
1932
April 1932 events